Konacık is a town in Bodrum district of Muğla Province, Turkey. At  the town is almost merged to Bodrum to the south east. The population of the Konacık is 11104    as of 2011.  Konacık was an ancient settlement named Pedesa meaning pathway in Luwian language (a language spoken in Anatolia before the 10th century BC.) Konacık was declared a seat of township in 1999.

References

Populated places in Muğla Province
Towns in Turkey
Bodrum District